The 22nd Critics' Choice Awards were presented on December 11, 2016 at the Barker Hangar at the Santa Monica Airport, honoring the finest achievements of filmmaking and television programming in 2016. The ceremony was broadcast on A&E and T.J. Miller returned to host for the second consecutive time. The television nominations were announced on November 14, 2016 while the film nominations were announced on December 1, 2016. HBO led the nominations for television with 22, followed by ABC and Netflix with 12 each. The People v. O. J. Simpson: American Crime Story won four awards, becoming the biggest TV winner of the night, followed by Anthony Bourdain: Parts Unknown, Saturday Night Live and Westworld with two wins each.

This year's ceremony date was moved to December from its usual January slot. The move came in hopes to get ahead of the 74th Golden Globe Awards on NBC. However, the following ceremony returned back to its traditional January date in 2018.

Viola Davis received the first-ever #SeeHer Award, an honor that recognized her work furthering the portrayal of three-dimensional women onscreen in 2016. The award is presented by the Association of National Advertisers in conjunction with A&E Networks.

Winners and nominees

Film

Television

#SeeHer Award
Viola Davis

Films with multiple nominations and wins
The following twenty-nine films received multiple nominations:

The following seven films received multiple awards:

Television programs with multiple nominations and wins
The following programs received multiple nominations:

The following programs received multiple awards:

References

External links
 22nd Annual Critics' Choice Awards – Winners

Broadcast Film Critics Association Awards
2016 film awards
2016 in California
December 2016 events in the United States